St. Nicholas Church is the Anglican parish church of West Itchenor, a village in the Chichester district of West Sussex, United Kingdom.

History 
In around 1175 Hugh Esturmy was given permission by the Bishop of Chichester John of Greenford and the Prebendary of Wightring to build a chapel in Itchenor. Between 1180 and 1197 Bishop Seffrid II allowed the chapel to be converted into a little parish church with its own graveyard. In 1935 the Parish of Itchenor was united with the Parish of Birdham as a single benefice. In 1986 the benefice of Itchenor and Birdham was united with the Parish of West Wittering. From there after the Vicar of West Wittering was made the Rector of the Benefice of West Wittering and Birdham with Itchenor, which is what the benefice is known as today.

Music 
The annals of the village indicate that string or wind instruments would have been used to accompany the singing prior to 1862. From 1862 church music at St. Nicholas developed: a harmonium was purchased in 1870 to take place of the string and wind instruments, and in 1922 a small pipe organ was acquired. The next step forward came in 1950 when a new electric blower was installed. In 1956 the building of a vestry forced the ageing 34 year-old pipe organ to be moved. Due to its poor state, the organist of the church Margot Linton-Bogle, donated a small reed organ which was installed at the West end of the church. In 1961 Linton-Bogle donated a Jennings electronic organ. The organ was moved onto the newly built gallery in 1964 (the site where the current organ stands today). In 1970 the organ's maintenance caused difficulties and Linton-Bogle donated a Compton pipe organ. It wasn't until 1994 when the new organist Margaret Thomas donated the Viscount organ which is in use today.

Currently there are three bells: The Treble, The Second and The Tenor. The Treble dates from 1530 whilst both The Second and The Tenor are from the seventeenth century. The bells were re-hung in 1988 by Whitechapel Bell Foundry. Ellacombe apparatus was installed, allowing the bells to either be swing chimed or hand chimed. The church bells chime before services, before and/or after weddings and funerals. The bells are usually rung by the churchwardens.

Rectors 

 1363 Roger Lyndon
 1363 Robert de Brendbirgthen
 1415 Richard Estan
 1415 John Seyll
 1438 Richard atte Okes
 1438 Thomas Hogge
 1502 Robert Kirkelond
 1502 William Prestall
 1527 Robert Kisleive
 1541 Robert Frost
 1541 Thomas Hewetson
 1550 John Spyncke
 1555 Stephen Parker
 1556 Oliver Chype
 1561 Thomas Secker
 1598 Philip Timmins
 1599 Roger Smith
 1613 Robert Meakon
 1615 Thomas Smith
 1616 John Cartwright
 1625 Robert Johnson
 1640 John Knight
 1662 William Sergeant
 1674 John Radford
 1676 Humphrey Day
 1699 Thomas Kelway
 1722 Robert Hulbert
 1735 Thomas Darwent
 1736 John Marewood
 1771 Thomas Sampson
 1800 William Williams
 1825 Robert Tredcroft
 1847 Stenning Johnson
 1865 Alfred Fuller
 1879 George Heath
 1902 Francis Haines
 1916 Albert Tansey
 1934 Victor Dunphy
 1952 Maurice Elliott
 1955 R. Wright
 1968 Roy Goodchild
 1974 John Stewnette
 1976 Philip Barry
 1981 Kenneth Woolhouse
 1986 Trevor Smyth
 1994 John Williams
 2012 Jonathan Swindells

See also

Grade I listed buildings in West Sussex
List of current places of worship in Chichester (district)

References

External links
The Benefice of West Wittering and Birdham with Itchenor
Stained Glass Windows at St. Nicholas

Church of England church buildings in West Sussex
Grade I listed churches in West Sussex